The 2022 British GT Championship (known for sponsorship reasons as the 2022 Intelligent Money British GT Championship) is the 30th British GT Championship, a sports car championship promoted by the SRO Motorsports Group. The season began on 16 April at Oulton Park and will end on 16 October at Donington Park.

Calendar
The calendar was unveiled on 15 September 2021.

Entry list

GT3

GT4

Race Results
Bold indicates overall winner for each car class (GT3 and GT4).

GT3

GT4

Championship Standings 
Points were awarded as follows:

An additional point is awarded to both GT3 and GT4 driver who sets their class' fastest race lap.

Drivers' Championships

Overall

Pro-Am Cup

Notes

See also
 2022 GT World Challenge Europe
 2022 GT World Challenge Europe Sprint Cup
 2022 GT World Challenge Europe Endurance Cup
 2022 GT World Challenge Asia
 2022 GT World Challenge America
 2022 GT World Challenge Australia
 2022 Intercontinental GT Challenge

References

External links

	

British GT Championship seasons
GT Championship
British GT